Fighting Man of the Plains is a 1949 American Western film directed by Edwin L. Marin. It stars Randolph Scott, Bill Williams, Victor Jory and Jane Nigh. Dale Robertson had his first credited role, playing Jesse James.

Plot

Jim Dancer is one of Quantrill's Raiders, staging attacks on Kansas on behalf of the fallen Confederacy in the years following the Civil War. He killed an unarmed man he wrongly holds responsible for his brother's death during an attack.

Cast
 Randolph Scott as Jim Dancer
 Bill Williams as Marshal Johnny Tancred
 Victor Jory as Dave Oldham 
 Jane Nigh as Florence Peel
 Douglas Kennedy as Prosecutor Kenneth 'Ken' Vedder 
 Joan Taylor as Evelyn Slocum  
 James Todd as Paul Hobson  
 Rhys Williams as Justice of the Peace Chandler Leach  
 Barry Kelley as Bert Slocum  
 Tony Hughes as Kerrigan   
 Dale Robertson as Jesse James
 Paul Fix as Yancy

References

External links
 
 
 

1949 films
Films directed by Edwin L. Marin
Cinecolor films
1949 Western (genre) films
American Western (genre) films
Films scored by Paul Sawtell
1940s English-language films
1940s American films